The Goytacazes National Forest is a national forest in the state of Espírito Santo, Brazil.

Location

The Goytacazes National Forest  is in the municipality of Linhares, Espírito Santo.
It is on the south side of the Doce River, opposite the town of Linhares.
The forest and its buffer zone is in the Atlantic Forest biome, on alluvial soil from the last marine recession in the Holocene, which gives it unique characteristics.
The forest is crossed by a power transmission line, with access routes for maintenance, and by the Alaesse Fiorot municipal road.
Threats include hunting and illegal extraction of plant resources, invasion by domestic animals and introduced plant and animal species.

History

The Goytacazes National Forest was created by federal decree of 28 November 2002 with the objectives of promoting management of multiple uses of natural resources, maintaining and protecting water resources and biodiversity, recovering degraded areas and supporting environmental education.
It became part of the Central Atlantic Forest Ecological Corridor, created in 2002.
It is classed as IUCN protected area category VI (protected area with sustainable use of natural resources).
It is managed by the Chico Mendes Institute for Biodiversity Conservation.

The management plan was published in January 2013.

Notes

Sources

National forests of Brazil
Protected areas of Espírito Santo
2002 establishments in Brazil